Marchant de Lange (born 13 October 1990) is a South African cricketer who plays for Gloucestershire.

He is a right-arm fast bowler and tail-end right-handed batsman and was called up to the South Africa squad from relative obscurity and little first-class experience for the series against Sri Lanka. De Lange was drafted as a late replacement for Vernon Philander in the second test match against Sri Lanka and returned figures of 8/126 on Test debut, including 7/81 in the Sri Lankan first innings. The figures are the best for any bowler in Test cricket in 2011.

He is qualified to play in the English county cricket due to his British spouse.

Playing style
de Lange is a tall right-arm fast bowler with an ability to gain swing and accuracy. Prior to his cricketing career, de Lange was a javelin thrower hence his ability to attain such impressive pace around 145–150 km/hr from a short run-up.

International career
de Lange, at the age of 19, made his first class debut in 2010 for Easterns against Free State and returned match figures of 4/99. He was called up to the South Africa squad from relative obscurity and little first-class experience for the series against Sri Lanka and impressed in the second test with pace and bounce claiming 7–81 in the Sri Lankan first-innings and capturing 1–56 in the second. He suffered an injury during an unofficial T20 series in Zimbabwe in early 2012 and was forced to remodel his action to prevent further recurrences of the injury happening again.

He made his Twenty20 debut against New Zealand on 19 February 2012 at Hamilton. He took the wicket of Martin Guptill on his debut.

T20 franchise cricket
Marchant de Lange was a surprise buy in the 2012 Indian Premier League Auction with Kolkata Knight Riders notching him up for his base price of $50,000. That season he played in three matches and picked up 3 wickets at an average of 35.66.

In players auction for IPL 2014, Mumbai Indians bought this talented bowler for Rs. 30 lakhs. He debuted for them in their second match against Delhi Daredevils replacing their best bowler Lasith Malinga. It was an important match as Mumbai needed to win all their in order to qualify for the playoffs. He went for 10 in his first over but impressed everyone with a great comeback, bowling Dinesh Karthik out in the first ball he bowled to him and later getting the important wicket of Manoj Tiwary. He finished with figures 2/31 and received the Kanna Keep Calm award for keeping his cool and turning the game around for his team.

In October 2018, he was named in Durban Heat's squad for the first edition of the Mzansi Super League T20 tournament.

In 2021, he took the first 5 Wicket Haul in the inaugural edition of  The Hundred while playing for the Trent Rockets. He finished the season as a joint leading taker with 12 wickets in total. In December 2021, he was signed by Islamabad United following the players' draft for the 2022 Pakistan Super League. In April 2022, he was bought by the Trent Rockets for the 2022 season of The Hundred.

See also
 List of South Africa cricketers who have taken five-wicket hauls on Test debut

References

External links
 

1990 births
Living people
People from Tzaneen
Sportspeople from Limpopo
South African emigrants to the United Kingdom
South African cricketers
South Africa Test cricketers
South Africa One Day International cricketers
South Africa Twenty20 International cricketers
Cricketers who have taken five wickets on Test debut
Easterns cricketers
Titans cricketers
Kolkata Knight Riders cricketers
Mumbai Indians cricketers
Guyana Amazon Warriors cricketers
Barbados Royals cricketers
Knights cricketers
Free State cricketers
Glamorgan cricketers
Durban Heat cricketers
Somerset cricketers
Trent Rockets cricketers
Dambulla Aura cricketers
Islamabad United cricketers